In the 19th century, German chemist and physicist Julius von Mayer derived a relation between specific heat at constant pressure and the specific heat at constant volume for an ideal gas. Mayer's relation states that

,

For more general homogeneous substances, not just ideal gases, the difference takes the form,

From this latter relation, several inferences can be made:
 Since the isothermal compressibility  is positive for nearly all phases, and the square of thermal expansion coefficient  is always either a positive quantity or zero, the specific heat at constant pressure is nearly always greater than or equal to specific heat at constant volume:
 ≥ .
There are no known exceptions to this principle for gases or liquids, but certain solids are known to exhibit negative compressibilities  and presumably these would be (unusual) cases where  < .
Also for substances that are nearly incompressible, such as solids and liquids, the difference between the two specific heats is negligible.
Exceptions to this rule might be found in systems exhibiting residual entropy due to disorder within the crystal.

References 

Thermodynamic equations